The Road to Freedom may refer to:

 The Road to Freedom (Chris de Burgh album), 2004
 The Road to Freedom (L. Ron Hubbard album), 1986
 Road to Freedom (album), by Young Disciples, 1991
 The Road to Freedom (film), a 2010 American-Cambodian war film
 Road to Freedom (journal), a 1924–1932 American anarchist monthly
 The Road to Freedom, a 1919–1920 Russian/Ukrainian anarchist newspaper published by adherents of the Makhnovshchina